Antoine, Duke of Montpensier (Antoine Marie Philippe Louis d'Orléans; 31 July 18244 February 1890), was a member of the French royal family in the House of Orléans. He was the youngest son of King Louis Philippe of France and his wife Maria Amelia Teresa of the Two Sicilies. He was styled as the Duke of Montpensier. He was born on 31 July 1824 at the château de Neuilly and died 4 February 1890 at Sanlúcar de Barrameda, Spain.

Marriage and issue
On 10 October 1846 at Madrid, Spain, he married  Infanta Luisa Fernanda of Spain, the daughter of King Ferdinand VII of Spain and his wife Maria Christina of the Two Sicilies.

They had ten children:
  Maria Isabel (1848–1919), who married her first cousin Philippe, comte de Paris (1838–94), the French claimant, and became known as Marie Isabelle, comtesse de Paris. She had several children.
 Maria Amelia (1851–1870)
 Maria Cristina (1852–1879)
 Maria de la Regla (1856–1861)
 [?] (1857-1857)
 Fernando (1859–1873)
 Mercedes (1860–1878), otherwise Princess Marie des Graces d'Orleans-Montpensier, who married her first cousin Alfonso XII and is historically known as Mercedes of Orleans, queen of Spain. No children.
 Felipe Raimundo Maria (1862–1864)
 Antonio (1866–1930), became Duke of Galliera in Italy. He married his first cousin Infanta Eulalia of Spain (1864–1958), daughter of Isabella II, and had two sons.
 Luis Maria Felipe Antonio (1867–1874)

Candidate for the Spanish throne
Antoine de Montpensier lived in Spain from 1848 when he and his family had to leave France after the Revolution of 1848. During the Spanish revolution of 1868, he supported the insurgents under Juan Prim against Queen Isabel II, his own sister-in-law.

In 1870 he fought a duel against Infante Enrique, Duke of Seville, the brother of King Francisco, and killed him. Antoine was convicted and sentenced to one month in prison.

On 16 November 1870 the Cortes voted for the next king and chose Amadeo of Savoy with 191 votes. Antoine only received 27 votes, and left Spain, only to return in 1874. His ambitions were fulfilled by his daughter Mercedes, who became Queen of Spain after her marriage to Alfonso XII, son of Isabella II. However, she died at the age of 18 without issue.

Despite never reaching the throne, however, through cognates, he is an ancestor of all Spanish monarchs since Juan Carlos I.  His great granddaughter Mercedes, Countess of Barcelona, was the mother of Juan Carlos, who assumed the throne in 1975 and later abdicated in favor of his son, Felipe VI in 2014.

Early collector of photography
The Duke of Montpensier was an early collector of photography. His collection consisted of dozens of albums and hundreds of early photographs, mainly of Spanish, French and British photographers. The collection was dispersed after his death.

Honours and arms

Honours
  Kingdom of France: Grand Cross of the Legion of Honour, 9 November 1845
 :
 Knight of the Golden Fleece, 10 October 1846
 Grand Cross of the Order of Charles III, with Collar
 Grand Cross of the Military Order of St. Hermenegild
 Grand Cross of Military Merit, with Red Decoration
 :
 Knight of the House Order of Fidelity, 1846
 Grand Cross of the Zähringer Lion, 1846
 : Grand Cordon of the Order of Leopold, 11 December 1844
 : Grand Cross of the Tower and Sword
  Beylik of Tunis: Husainid Family Order
 : Grand Cross of St. Ferdinand and Merit

Arms
Prince Antoine did not have a personal coat of arms. He used the traditional arms of the House of Orléans, consisting of:
Azure, three fleur-de-lis Or and a label Argent
[In heraldic blazon, Azure is blue, Or is gold, and Argent is silver]

This coat of arms was first used by Philippe d'Orléans, nephew and son in law of King Louis XIV of France. As cadets of the French royal family, they bore the arms of France differenced by a label argent.

Ancestry

References

|- 

|- 

1824 births
1890 deaths
Antoine Marie Philippe Louis d'Orleans
Dukes of Galliera
Princes of France (Orléans)
Spanish captain generals
Burials in the Pantheon of Infantes at El Escorial
Grand Croix of the Légion d'honneur
Knights of the Golden Fleece of Spain
Grand Crosses of the Royal and Military Order of San Hermenegild
Grand Crosses of Military Merit
French duellists
Children of Louis Philippe I
Sons of kings